Henri Davids (30 January 1873 – 16 February 1950) was a British fencer. He competed in the individual épée event at the 1908 Summer Olympics.

References

External links
 

1873 births
1950 deaths
British male fencers
Olympic fencers of Great Britain
Fencers at the 1908 Summer Olympics